Luca Enrico Roberto Morisi (born 22 February 1991) is an Italian professional rugby union player who primarily plays centre for London Irish of the English Premiership. He has also represented Italy at international level, having made his test debut against England during the 2012 Six Nations Championship. Morisi has previously played for clubs such as Milano, Benetton, and Crociati in the past.

Professional career 
Morisi participated in eleven seasons for Benetton Treviso between 2011 and 2022, the first of which he spent as a permit player under contract with Crociati. He was selected in the Italy under-20 team from 2009 to 2011. Morisi received a call-up to the Italian squad in January 2012 in preparation for the Six Nations Championship. He joined Benetton Treviso in 2012 and was included in the final 31-man roster for the 2019 Rugby World Cup on August 18, 2019.

References

External links 

1991 births
Living people
Italian rugby union players
Italy international rugby union players
Rugby union centres
Sportspeople from Milan
Benetton Rugby players